Mary Michael Patterson is an American theater actress and singer. She was raised in Aledo, Texas, a suburb west of Fort Worth. She graduated from the University of Michigan with a BFA in Musical Theater. She is married to Broadway Dancer Cary Tedder.

Patterson started her professional career performing in regional theater. She made her Broadway debut in the 2011 revival of Anything Goes as the understudy for Hope. Two years later, she joined the Broadway company of The Phantom of the Opera as the alternate Christine Daaé and later become the principal in September 2014 when Sierra Boggess departed the show. Patterson joined the US touring company as Meg Giry in Love Never Dies, which ran from September, 2017 to December, 2018.

Performance credits

References

21st-century American actresses
Actresses from Texas
American musical theatre actresses
University of Michigan School of Music, Theatre & Dance alumni